The Luxembourg Palace is at 15 Rue de Vaugirard in the 6th arrondissement of Paris. It was originally built (1615–1645) to the designs of the French architect Salomon de Brosse to be the royal residence of the regent Marie de' Medici, mother of King Louis XIII. After the Revolution it was refashioned (1799–1805) by Jean Chalgrin into a legislative building and subsequently greatly enlarged and remodeled (1835–1856) by Alphonse de Gisors. The palace has been the seat of the upper houses of the various French national legislatures (excepting only the unicameral National Assembly of the Second Republic) since the establishment of the Sénat conservateur during the Consulate; as such, it has been home to the Senate of the Fifth Republic since its establishment in 1958.

Immediately west of the palace on the Rue de Vaugirard is the Petit Luxembourg, now the residence of the Senate President; and slightly further west, the Musée du Luxembourg, in the former orangery. On the south side of the palace, the formal Luxembourg Garden presents a  green parterre of gravel and lawn populated with statues and large basins of water where children sail model boats.

History

Palace as royal residence
After the death of Henry IV in 1610, his widow, Marie de' Medici, became regent to her son, Louis XIII. Having acceded to a much more powerful position, she decided to erect a new palace for herself, adjacent to an old hôtel particulier owned by François de Luxembourg, Duc de Piney, which is now called the Petit Luxembourg and is the residence of the president of the French Senate.

Marie de' Medici desired to make a building similar to her native Florence's Palazzo Pitti; to this effect she had the architect Métezeau (either Louis Métezeau or his brother, Clément Métezeau) sent to Florence to make detailed drawings of the building.

She bought the Hôtel de Luxembourg and its fairly extensive domain in 1612 and commissioned the new building, which she referred to as her Palais Médicis, in 1615. Its construction and furnishing formed her major artistic project, though nothing remains today of the interiors as they were created for her, save some architectural fragments reassembled in the Salle du Livre d'Or. The suites of paintings she commissioned, in the subjects of which she expressed her requirements through her agents and advisers, are scattered among museums.

De' Medici installed her household in 1625, while work on interiors continued. The apartments in the right wing on the western side were reserved for the Queen and the matching suite to the east, for her son, Louis XIII, when he was visiting (floor plan). The 24 Marie de' Medici cycle canvases, a series commissioned from Peter Paul Rubens, were installed in the Galerie de Rubens on the main floor of the western wing. These paintings were executed between 1622 and 1625 and depicts Marie's struggles and triumphs in life. They are now visible in the Galerie Medicis of the Louvre, one of the treasures of the museum's Flemish paintings department. A series of paintings executed for her Cabinet doré ("gilded study") was identified by Anthony Blunt in 1967.

The gallery in the east wing had been intended for the display of paintings celebrating Henri IV and buildings housing stables and services were planned to either side of the pavilions flanking the entrance on the street, but these projects remained unfinished in 1631, when the Queen Mother was forced from court, following the "Day of the Dupes" in November. Louis XIII commissioned further decorations for the Palace from Nicolas Poussin and Philippe de Champaigne.

In 1642, Marie de' Medici bequeathed the Luxembourg to her second and favourite son, Gaston, duc d'Orléans, who called it the Orléans Palace (Palais d'Orléans) but by popular will it was still known by its original name. Upon Gaston's death, the palace passed to his widow, Marguerite de Lorraine, then to his elder daughter by his first marriage, Anne, duchesse de Montpensier, La Grande Mademoiselle. In 1660, Anne de Montpensier sold the Luxembourg to her younger half-sister, Élisabeth Marguerite d'Orléans, duchesse de Guise who, in turn, gave it to her cousin, King Louis XIV, in 1694.

In 1715, the Luxembourg Palace became the residence of Marie Louise Élisabeth d'Orléans, Duchess of Berry. The widowed Duchess was notoriously promiscuous, having the reputation of a French Messalina, relentlessly driven by her unquenchable thirst for all pleasures of the flesh. The palace and its gardens thus became stages where the princess acted out her ambitions, enthroned like a queen surrounded by her court. In some of her more exclusive parties, Madame de Berry also played the leading part in elaborate "tableaux-vivants" that represented mythological scenes and in which she displayed her person impersonating Venus or Diana. According to various satirical songs which scurrilously evoked her amours "the Lady of the Luxembourg" hid several pregnancies, shutting herself up from society when about to give birth. Her taste for strong liquors and her sheer gluttony also scandalized the court. On 21 May 1717, Madame de Berry received Peter the Great at the Luxembourg. She welcomed the visiting Tsar splendidly dressed in a magnificent sack-back gown which showcased her voluptuous bosom as well as her mischievous face but also helped conceal her growing corpulence for she was then in an "interesting condition".

On 28 February 1718, the Duchess of Berry threw a magnificent party for her visiting aunt, the Duchess of Lorraine. The entire palace and its gardens were elaborately illuminated. The lavish banquet was followed by a masked ball. Madame de Berry made a dazzling appearance before her guests. She was then in the full splendour of her youthful beauty and pride and acted as if she were the very incarnation of the goddess of love, mirth, beauty and sensual pleasures. On 2 April 1719, after a grueling four-day labour, shut up in a small room of her palace, the young widow was delivered of a still-born baby girl, supposedly fathered by her lieutenant of the guards, the Count of Riom. Berry's delivery was extremely troublesome and almost killed her. The Church refused her the Sacraments thus adding moral infamy to the physical tortures of the labouring woman. Saint-Simon wrote a very sarcastic description of this childbirth. Hoping to regain her health and undeceive the public that she had been confined, Madame de Berry left Paris and the Luxembourg Palace. She died in her castle at La Muette on 21 July 1719 and, according to Saint-Simon, was found to be again pregnant.

In 1750, the palace became a museum, the forerunner of the Louvre, and was open two days a week until 1779. In 1778, the Luxembourg Palace was given to the comte de Provence by his brother Louis XVI. During the French Revolution, it was briefly a prison, then the seat of the French Directory, and in 1799, the home of the Sénat conservateur and the first residence of Napoleon Bonaparte, as First Consul of the French Republic.

Palace as legislature seat

From 1799 to 1805, the architect Jean Chalgrin transformed the palace into a legislative building. He demolished the grand central staircase (escalier d'honneur), replacing it with a senate chamber on the first floor, which incorporated and destroyed Marie de Médicis' chapel on the garden side of the corps de logis. Chalgrin also enclosed the flanking terraces, making space for a library. At the same time he created a neo-classical escalier d'honneur in the west wing, a single monumental flight enclosed by an Ionic colonnade and covered with a coffered barrel vault, the construction of which resulted in the destruction of the long gallery that had formerly housed the cycle of paintings by Rubens.

Beginning in 1835, the architect Alphonse de Gisors added a new garden wing parallel to the old corps de logis, replicating the look of the original 17th-century facade so precisely that it is difficult to distinguish at first glance the old from the new. The new senate chamber was located in what would have been the courtyard area in-between.

The new wing included a library (bibliothèque) with a cycle of paintings (1845–1847) by Eugène Delacroix. In the 1850s, at the request of Emperor Napoleon III, Gisors created the highly decorated Salle des Conférences (inspired by the Galerie d'Apollon of the Louvre), which influenced the nature of subsequent official interiors of the Second Empire, including those of the Palais Garnier.

During the German occupation of France (1940–44), Hermann Göring took over the palace as the headquarters of the Luftwaffe in France, taking for himself a sumptuous suite of rooms to accommodate his visits to the French capital. His subordinate, Luftwaffe Field Marshal Hugo Sperrle, was also given an apartment in the Luxembourg Palace; he spent most of the war enjoying the luxurious surroundings. "The Field Marshal's craving for luxury and public display ran a close second to that of his superior, Goering; he was also his match in corpulence", wrote armaments minister Albert Speer after a visit to Sperrle in Paris.

The palace was a designated "strong point" for German forces defending the city in August 1944, but thanks to the decision of Commanding General Dietrich von Choltitz to surrender the city rather than fight, the palace was only minimally damaged although furniture was stolen. On 7 November 1944, following the Liberation of France, the Provisional Consultative Assembly held its first meeting at the Luxembourg Palace.

From 29 July to 15 October 1946, the Luxembourg Palace was the site of the talks of the Paris Peace Conference.

Gallery

See also

 List of works by James Pradier

References

Notes

Sources
 Ayers, Andrew (2004). The Architecture of Paris. Stuttgart; London: Edition Axel Menges. .
 BeauxArts éditions (2012), Palais du Luxembourg, 
 Benevolo, Leonardo (1978). The Architecture of the Renaissance, vol. 2. Boulder, Colorado: Westview Press. .
 Collins, Peter (2004). Concrete: The Vision of a New Architecture, 2nd edition. Montreal: McGill-Queen's University Press. .
 Hustin, Arthur (1904). Le Palais du Luxembourg. Paris: P. Mouillot. Listings at WorldCat. View at Google Books.

External links
 "The Luxembourg Palace" at the website of the French Senate

1615 establishments in France
Baroque buildings in France
Buildings and structures in the 6th arrondissement of Paris
Châteaux in Paris
French Parliament
Gardens in Paris
Defunct prisons in Paris
Houses completed in 1615
Legislative buildings in Europe
Palaces in France
Royal residences in France
Seats of national legislatures
Terminating vistas in Paris
Government buildings with domes